Infinality bundle is a font and libraries bundle aimed at optimized text rendering under Linux. It comprises patched versions of FreeType (with optimized settings), fontconfig and cairo.

Infinality bundle replaces non-free fonts by free alternatives.

External links 
 Infinality bundle & fonts 
 infinality.net

References

Free computer libraries